Bort is an English name meaning "fortified". It is also an eastern Ashkenazic surname that refers to a man with a remarkable beard. It originates from the Yiddish word "bord" and the German "Bart", which both mean "beard". It may also originate from the Polish word "borta", a loanword from the German "borte" meaning "braid" or "galloon".

The name is a running gag in a 1994 episode of The Simpsons, "Itchy & Scratchy Land". At an amusement park gift shop, a bemused Bart is unable to find any merchandise with his name, finding Bert and "Bort" items instead. A young boy and a man nearby are both named Bort. Later in the episode, a park employee announces that Bort license plates have sold out.  The gag is revisited in the 2017 episode "The Cad and the Hat", with more such license plates for sale in a souvenir shop.

Notable people named Bort include:
Joan Barreda Bort
Lewis Bort
Léon Teisserenc de Bort
Pierre Edmond Teisserenc de Bort
Børt-Erik Thoresen

References

Ashkenazi surnames